Nijman is a Dutch surname. Among variant forms are Neijman, Neyman, Nieman(s), and Nyman. It originated as a nickname for either an unknown or nameless person, related to modern Dutch niemand ("nobody"), or for a newcomer to a place (modern Dutch nieuw man, cognate to English Newman and German Neumann. People with this surname include:

Brigitte Nijman (born 1970), Duch musical actress, singer and voice actor
Hans Nijman (1959–2014), Dutch mixed martial artist and professional wrestler.
Jan Willem Nijman (born 1990s), Dutch video game developer
Jerry Nijman (born 1966), Suriname-born Dutch boxer
Marijn Nijman (born 1985), Dutch cricketer, sister of Ruud
Max Nijman (1941–2016), Surinamese singer
Ruud Nijman (born 1982), Dutch cricketer, brother of Marijn
Yosh Nijman (born 1996), American football player

References

Dutch-language surnames
Surnames of Dutch origin